East Oakland Youth Development Center (EOYDC) is a 501(c)(3) non-profit organization in Oakland, California, United States. It opened in 1978. EOYDC works to develop the social and leadership capacities of youth and young adults (ages 5 to 24) to prepare them for employment, higher education, and leadership. EOYDC describes itself as a community-based solution for solving social injustice and inequality, and a national model for youth development.

History 
EOYDC was founded in 1973 and opened its doors in 1978 by Robert B. Shetterly, then-CEO of Clorox. Although Shetterly was a prominent businessman and a long-time resident of Orinda, he also had ties in Oakland, and he encouraged a number of businesses to move to Oakland over other local cities. Clorox helped fund EOYDC in its early years and later on. Since it opened, it began providing free programs five days a week for people in the Elmhurst District of East Oakland. Since 1994, EOYDC has been under the leadership of Regina Jackson.

Mission 
The mission of EOYDC is to develop the social and leadership capacities of youth so that they succeed in education, career, and service to their communities. EOYDC works to incorporate relationship building, youth and community involvement, and skill building. It also aims to lessen the risks faced by youth, increasing protection. EOYDC tries to fulfill this mission by offering educational, cultural, artistic expression and recreation programs.

Programs 
The four core programs of EOYDC are art, education, jobs, and wellness. These departments are structured to encourage self-sufficiency and responsibility. Of primary concern at the EOYDC is teaching youth to embrace their cultures and to live and work responsibly and cooperatively with other communities. EOYDC offers three education programs: After School Leadership Academy, Pathway to College and Career, and Education Empowerment.

The After School Leadership Academy is an after school program for students in kindergarten to 8th grade. The program provides homework help, tutoring, and enrichment activities.

Pathway to College and Career is a readiness program to prepare students in 9th to 12th grade for post-secondary life, with an emphasis on college persistence and completion. The program has workshops, SAT prep, and discussion forums. From 2010 to 2016, the program had a 96% college graduation rate among alumni.

Education Empowerment is for students ages 17.5 and up who have not completed high school. The program prepares students to take the High School Equivalency Test (HiSET, previously known as the GED).

Funding and sponsors 
EOYDC receives some government funding, while most funding comes from private grants and donors, and some from corporate grants and individuals. The largest donors include: U.S. Bank, Clorox Company Foundation, Wayne and Gladys Valley Foundation, SD Bechtel Jr. Foundation, Northern California Community Loan Fund, Lexus, SouthWest Airlines, Apple, the musician Prince, the San Francisco Foundation, and others.

Notable alumni
Jabari Brown, former NBA player
Keyshia Cole, singer, songwriter, record producer, and television personality
Mark Curry, actor and comedian
Antonio Davis, former NBA player
Keyondrei “Kiwi” Gardner, former Saudi Premier League basketball player
Drew Gooden, NBA player
Aaron Goodwin, sports agent
Greg Foster, former NBA player, NBA assistant coach
Damian Lillard, NBA player
Jason Kidd, former NBA player, NBA head coach
Kirk Morrison, former NFL player
Gary Payton, former NBA player
Leon Powe, former NBA player
Brian Shaw, former NBA player, former NBA head coach
D'Wayne Wiggins, musician, producer, and composer
J.R. Reid, former NBA player
Demetrius "Hook" Mitchell, former streetball player
Davone Bess, former NFL player

References

External links
EOYDC.org

Youth organizations based in California
Organizations based in Oakland, California